Dean Samuel Coleman (born 18 September 1985) is an English footballer who plays as a goalkeeper for Halesowen Town.

Career

Walsall
Born in Dudley, West Midlands, Coleman came up through the youth system at Football League club Walsall, playing in two first team games during the 2004–05 season and spending the 2005–06 season on loan at Halesowen Town, before being released by the club in May 2006.

Bromsgrove Rovers
He played for Bromsgrove Rovers during the 2006–07 season.

Willenhall
Also during the 2006–07 season he played for Willenhall Town.
Helping Willenhall to the Southern Football League Division One Midlands play-off Final in May 2007.

Kidderminster Harriers
 Coleman joined Conference National club Kidderminster Harriers in July 2007. He was used as a back-up to the club's other goalkeepers Scott Bevan and Chris Mackenzie during the 2007–08 season and signed a new one-year contract in May 2008.

Halesowen Town
In the 2010–11 season Coleman joined Halesowen Town in a part exchange deal with Kidderminster Harriers and has become a regular starter for the Yeltz, Starting every game so far. Dean left Halesowen but since rejoined in December 2012.

References

External links

Dean Coleman profile at the Halesowen Town website
Dean Coleman profile at the Kidderminster Harriers website

1985 births
Living people
Sportspeople from Dudley
English footballers
Association football goalkeepers
Walsall F.C. players
Halesowen Town F.C. players
Bromsgrove Rovers F.C. players
Willenhall Town F.C. players
Kidderminster Harriers F.C. players
English Football League players
National League (English football) players
Worcester City F.C. players